Benjamin Keith Cleveland (born August 25, 1998) is an American football offensive guard for the Baltimore Ravens of the National Football League (NFL). He played college football at Georgia, and was drafted by the Ravens in the third round of the 2021 NFL Draft.

Early life and high school
Cleveland grew up in Toccoa, Georgia, and attended Stephens County High School, where he played baseball and football. He was rated a four star recruit and committed to play college football at Georgia during the summer before his junior season.

College career
Cleveland redshirted his true freshman season. He played in all 15 of Georgia's games as a redshirt freshman and started the final five, including the 2018 College Football Playoff National Championship game. Cleveland started eight games with six games missed due to an injury in his redshirt sophomore season. He played in 13 games with seven starts at right guard as a redshirt junior. Cleveland returned to being a full-time starter at right guard in his final season at Georgia was named first-team All-Southeastern Conference and a third-team All-American by the Associated Press after starting nine games in the COVID-19 shortened 2020 season.

Professional career

Baltimore Ravens
Cleveland was selected in the third round with the 94th overall pick of the 2021 NFL Draft by the Baltimore Ravens. On July 20, 2021, Cleveland signed his four-year rookie contract worth $4.8 million. He was placed on the active/non-football injury list at the start of training camp on July 21, 2021. On October 12, 2021, Cleveland suffered a knee injury in Week 5 against the Indianapolis Colts and was placed on injured reserve. On November 20, 2021, Cleveland was activated to the active roster from injured reserve.

References

External links 
Georgia Bulldogs bio

Living people
American football offensive guards
Georgia Bulldogs football players
Players of American football from Georgia (U.S. state)
Baltimore Ravens players
People from Toccoa, Georgia
1998 births